The 2017 Lamar Hunt U.S. Open Cup Final was played on September 20, 2017, at Children's Mercy Park in Kansas City, Kansas. The match determined the winner of the 2017 U.S. Open Cup, a tournament open to amateur and professional soccer teams affiliated with the United States Soccer Federation. It was the 104th edition of the oldest competition in United States soccer. This edition of the final was contested between Sporting Kansas City and the New York Red Bulls, both of Major League Soccer.

Kansas City and New York both play in the top tier of American soccer, Major League Soccer (MLS), and bypassed the initial stages of the tournament, with direct entry into the fourth round of play. Kansas City secured its berth in the final by defeating four other MLS teams; Minnesota United FC, Houston Dynamo, FC Dallas, and San Jose Earthquakes. New York's road to the final involved victories over three MLS teams and one USL team; New York City FC, Philadelphia Union, New England Revolution and FC Cincinnati.

Kansas City won their fourth title following a 2–1 win thanks to goals from Latif Blessing and Dániel Sallói. As winners, Kansas City qualified for the 2019 CONCACAF Champions League.

The match was broadcast in English on ESPN2 and in Spanish on ESPN Deportes, making it the third straight time the cup final was aired on one of the ESPN networks.

Road to the final

The U.S. Open Cup is an annual American soccer competition open to all United States Soccer Federation affiliated teams, from amateur adult club teams to the professional clubs of Major League Soccer (MLS). The 2017 competition was the 104th edition of the oldest soccer tournament in the United States.

Sporting Kansas City 

Sporting Kansas City had previously won the U.S. Open Cup in 2004, 2012, and the 2015, and to date, are the only Kansan club to have ever won the honor. To reach the final, Kansas City hosted three of their four cup fixture heading to the final.

New York Red Bulls 

The Red Bulls had only been to one previous Open Cup Final, the 2003 Lamar Hunt U.S. Open Cup Final, which the then-MetroStars lost to the Chicago Fire 0-1 at Giants Stadium. Two other teams from New Jersey, Elizabeth S.C. and Paterson F.C., have won the Open Cup, with Paterson F.C. winning the then-Challenge Cup in 1923 on a forfeit, and Elizabeth S.C. winning the Challenge Cup in 1970 and 1972.

Match

Details

References 

Lamar Hunt
Final
U.S. Open Cup Finals
U.S. Open Cup Final 2017
U.S. Open Cup Final 2017
Soccer in Kansas
U.S. Open Cup Final
Sports in Kansas City, Kansas